Bilogora (Bilo-gora, or Bilogorje, Bilo-gorje) is a low mountainous range in Central Croatia. It consists of a series of hills and small plains some 80 kilometres in length stretching in the direction northwest-southeast, along the southwest part of the Podravina region. The highest peak is called Rajčevica (309 m), located in the north of the mountain.

The area lends its name to the Bjelovar-Bilogora County, one of the 21 counties of Croatia with its seat in the nearby town of Bjelovar. The mountain is also located in the Koprivnica-Križevci County as well as the Virovitica-Podravina County.

Bilogora is geographically located between the rivers of Drava and Sava and is the source of smaller rivers Česma, Glogovnica and Ilova. Bilogora is considered to be the lowest mountainous region in Croatia, but is also the largest in terms of area. It serves as a drainage divide separating the drainage basins of the Sava and Drava rivers.

The Croatian Meteorological and Hydrological Service has a measuring station on Bilogora.

References

Mountain ranges of Croatia
Landforms of Bjelovar-Bilogora County